Fate's Decree is a 1914 American silent short drama film starring William Garwood, Richard Cummings, Fred Hamer, Justin MacDonald, and Billie West.

External links

1914 films
1914 drama films
Silent American drama films
American silent short films
American black-and-white films
1914 short films
1910s American films